Chris Slane (born 1957) is a left wing New Zealand cartoonist.

He has had cartoons published in Metro, New Zealand Herald and AA Directions magazine. Slane is currently the cartoonist for the New Zealand Listener and New Zealand Farmers Weekly.

He has a degree in town planning from the University of Auckland, and contributed to the student magazine Craccum while studying there.

Bibliography
The Home: your guide to social welfare homes (1985)
Sheep Thrills (1989) 
Let me Through, I have A Morbid Curiosity (1998) 
Maui: Legends Of The Outcast (1996)

External links
Slane - website
Slane - biography.
New Zealand Cartoon Gallery - a selection of Slanes latest cartoons.
"Privacy Cartoons Part 1"
"Privacy Cartoons Part 2"
Slane's work on Star Wars Tales #10
Photos of Slane's puppets built (and puppeteered) for the Space Knights Television series

1957 births
Living people
New Zealand cartoonists
People from Auckland
University of Auckland alumni